Vice-Admiral Sir Hyde Parker, 5th Baronet (1 February 1714 – 1782) was a British naval commander.

Parker was born at Tredington in Worcestershire. His father, a clergyman, was a son of Sir Henry Parker. His paternal grandfather had married a daughter of Alexander Hyde, Bishop of Salisbury. He began his career at sea in the merchant service. Entering the Royal Navy at the age of 24, he was made lieutenant in 1744, and in 1748 he was made post-captain. In his royal navy career, he captured a Spanish galleon that was worth £600,000. This gave his family its wealth. Currently, his descendants live in the south wing of Melford Hall.

Seven Years War

In October 1755 Hyde Parker commissioned the newly launched post ship . A year later, in her he captured the French privateer Très Vénėrable.

During the latter part of the Seven Years' War he served in the East Indies, taking part in the capture of Pondicherry in 1761 and of Manila in 1762. In the latter year Parker with two ships captured one of the valuable Spanish plate ships in her voyage between Acapulco and Manila.

American War of Independence
In 1778 he became Rear-Admiral and went to North American waters as second-in-command. For some time before George Rodney's arrival he was in command on the Leeward Islands station, and conducted a skilful campaign against the French at Martinique.

In 1781, having returned home and become Vice-Admiral, he fell in with a Dutch fleet of about his own force, though far better equipped, near the Dogger Bank on 5 August 1781. After a fiercely contested battle, in which neither combatant gained any advantage, both sides drew off. Parker considered that he had not been properly equipped for his task, and insisted on resigning his command.

In 1782 he accepted the East Indies command, though he had just succeeded to the family baronetcy. On the outward voyage his flagship,  was lost with all on board.

He was succeeded by his eldest son Harry Parker, the sixth Baronet. Parker's second son was Admiral Sir Hyde Parker (1739–1807).

Notes

References

 

1714 births
1782 deaths
Military personnel from Worcestershire
Baronets in the Baronetage of England
Royal Navy vice admirals
Deaths due to shipwreck at sea
People from the Borough of Tewkesbury
Admirals and Generals from Worcestershire
British military personnel of the Fourth Anglo-Dutch War
Royal Navy personnel of the Seven Years' War
Royal Navy personnel of the American Revolutionary War